6 P.M. may refer to:

A time on the 12-hour clock
HIT 92.9 (call sign: 6PM), a radio station in Perth, Western Australia
6pm, album by Phil Manzanera 2004
6PM, album by Kings of Tomorrow
6pm.com, online shoe and clothing retailer owned by Zappos

Date and time disambiguation pages